That's How Much I Love You is the sixth studio album by American vocal group, The Manhattans, released in 1974 through Columbia Records.

Reception
The album peaked at No. 59 on the R&B albums chart. It also reached No. 160 on the Billboard 200. The album features the singles "Don't Take Your Love", which peaked at No. 7 on the Hot Soul Singles chart and No. 37 on the Billboard Hot 100, and "Summertime in the City", which reached No. 45 on the Hot Soul Singles chart.

Track listing

Personnel
Norman Harris, Bobby Eli – guitar
Ron Kersey – piano
Vincent Montana Jr. – vibraphone
Ronnie Baker – bass
Earl Young – drums
Larry Washington – congas
Don Renaldo – horn and string section

Charts
Album

Singles

References

External links
 

1974 albums
The Manhattans albums
Albums produced by Bobby Martin
Albums arranged by Bobby Martin
Albums recorded at Sigma Sound Studios
Columbia Records albums